Ayyab was a ruler of Aštartu (present day Tell Ashtara) south of Damascus. According to the Amarna letters, cities/city-states and their kings in the region — just like countries to the north, such as Hatti of the Hittites, fell prey to a wave of attacks by Habiru raiders. The Amarna correspondence corpus covers a period from 1350–1335 BC.

Another ruler of Aštartu cited in the Amarna letters is Biridašwa. The letters do not clearly indicate their title, leading some scholars to describe them as kings of Damascus (Dimašqu) while others believe they were high Egyptian officials, possibly mayors.

Ayyab's letter EA 364
Ayyab is the author of only one letter to the Egyptian pharaoh, letter EA 364-(EA for 'el Amarna').

Title: Justified war
To the king, my lord: Message of Ayyab, your servant. I fall at the feet of my lord 7 times and 7 times. I am the servant of the king, my lord, the dirt at his feet. I have heard what the king, my lord, wrote to me through Atahmaya. Truly, I have guarded very carefully, (i.e. Ma-GAL, Ma-GAL), [the citie]s of the king, my lord. Moreover, note that it is the ruler of Hasura who has taken 3 cities from me. From the time I heard and verified this, there has been waging of war against him. Truly, may the king, my lord, take cognizance, and may the king, my lord, give thought to his servant.  —EA 364, lines 1-28 (complete)

Ayyab's name is referred to in only one letter of the Amarna letters corpus, one of two letters by Labaya's son: Mutbaal of the city, Pihilu, modern Pella, Jordan. The letter is EA 256, title: "Oaths and denials", (the oaths and denials by Mutbaal). See: "Tenuous identifications with Biblical figures": Labaya-(Mutbaal letter 256).

See also
 Aram-Damascus
 Biridašwa, mayor of Aštartu about 1350–1335 BC
 Shutu
 Tahmašši, Egyptian official
 Upu

References

Moran, William L. The Amarna Letters. Johns Hopkins University Press, 1987, 1992. (softcover)

Canaanite people
Amarna letters writers
14th-century BC rulers
14th-century BC people